Chișinău Theological Seminary is a seminary in Chișinău. Gavril Bănulescu-Bodoni opened the Romanian-language seminary on January 31, 1813.

History

On 1 September 1918, Visarion Puiu became director of the Chișinău Theological Seminary, being named Exarch of Bessarabia's monasteries two months later (soon after that province united with the Kingdom of Romania).

Notes

External links
 Romanian Metropolitan Visarion Puiu, by Protohierarch Sorin Petcu, Müllheim, July 2006
 Visarion Puiu in the Dictionary of Romanian Theologians
 Seminarul Teologic

History of Chișinău
Educational institutions established in 1813
Schools in Moldova
Eastern Orthodox seminaries
Eastern Orthodoxy in Moldova